Rescue (stylized as RescuE) is a studio album released by South Korean singer Younha. It was released on December 27, 2017, through Loen Entertainment. It consists of eleven tracks, including the lead single "Rescue".

Production
The album was produced by GroovyRoom.

Track listing

Charts
The album peaked at number 6 on the Gaon Albums Chart in 2017.

Reception
Billboard ranked the album eighth in its list of the top 25 greatest K-pop albums of the 2010s, describing it as "a cathartic listening experience that reflected on hard times and hinted to the brightness beyond them".

References

Kakao M albums
Younha albums
2017 albums